Bab Al-Asbat Minaret, Minaret of the Tribes  also known as  the ,  is a minaret in Jerusalem. It is one of the four minarets of the Haram al Sharif, and is situated along the north wall.

History
Bab al-Ashbat is a minaret built by the Mamluks in 1367. It is composed of a cylindrical stone shaft (of Ottoman construction), rising from a rectangular base on top of a triangular transition zone. The shaft narrows above the muezzin's balcony, and is dotted with circular windows, ending with a bulbous dome. The dome was reconstructed after the 1927 Jericho earthquake.

See also
 Gate of the Tribes of Israel
 Birket Israel (Pool of Israel)
Islam in Jerusalem

References

Bibliography

 (pp. 415−418)
(LXXI)
 (pp. 403-411)
 (pp. 133−136)

Mamluk architecture in the State of Palestine
Temple Mount

he:מבני הר הבית#צריח שער השבטים